Virgibacillus oceani is a Gram-positive, moderately halophilic, endospore, rod-shaped-forming, strictly aerobic and motile bacterium from the genus of Virgibacillus which has been isolated from sediments from the Pacific Ocean.

References

Bacillaceae
Bacteria described in 2015